Uruguayan Sign Language, or Lengua de señas uruguaya (LSU), is the deaf sign language of Uruguay, used since 1910. It is not intelligible with neighboring languages, though it may have historical connections with Paraguayan Sign Language.

In 2001, LSU was recognized as an official language of Uruguay under Law 17.378.

References

External links
Uruguayan Sign Language Dictionary - Uruguayan Sign Language Dictionary
The Uruguayan Deaf Community - Elizabeth Parks & Holly Williams, SIL International (2013)

Sign language isolates
Languages of Uruguay
Disability in Uruguay
Deaf culture in Uruguay